The Wetback Hound is a 1957 American live-action short film produced Walt Disney Productions. It was produced and co-directed by Larry Lansburgh, and it accompanied the theatrical release of the Disney feature Johnny Tremain. In 1958, the film won the Academy Award for Best Live Action Short Film at the 30th Academy Awards.

See also
 List of American films of 1957

References

External links

1957 films
1957 short films
Live Action Short Film Academy Award winners
Walt Disney Pictures films
Films produced by Walt Disney
Disney short films
1950s English-language films
American short films